Catherine Louise Murphy (born 26 September 1983) is a South African-born Irish former cricketer who played as a right-handed batter. She appeared in 2 Twenty20 Internationals for Ireland in 2008. She played in the Women's Super Series for Scorchers in 2017 and 2018.

References

External links

1983 births
Living people
Irish women cricketers
Ireland women Twenty20 International cricketers
Irish people of South African descent
Cricketers from Johannesburg
Scorchers (women's cricket) cricketers